Danam Nagender (born 9 August 1958) is an Indian politician and Member of the Legislative Assembly from Khairatabad Assembly Constituency, Hyderabad, Telangana, India. He joined (TRS) Telangana Rashtra Samithi in 2018. He was the Senior Leader of Congress Party in Hyderabad. He was also Minister for Labour, Employment, Training & Factories, Industrial Training Institutes & Health in United Andhra Pradesh. He had represented the Indian National Congress party. Nagender won his seat in the 2009 Andhra Pradesh State Assembly Elections. He lost it in the 2014 assembly elections. He resigned from Congress party on 23 June 2018, joined Telangana Rashtra Samithi and won from Khairatabad in general election Dec. 2018.

Career 
D. Nagender was elected from Asifnagar assembly constituency in 1994, 1999 and 2004 as a Member of the Legislative Assembly. In the 2004 Andhra Pradesh state Assembly elections, he left the Indian National Congress (INC) for the Telugu Desam Party (TDP). After winning from Asifnagar on the TDP ticket, he resigned his seat and left the TDP in an effort to get a place in the cabinet of Y. S. Rajasekhara Reddy through re-election as an INC MLA. He failed in the by-election. In an interview to the Press ABN Andhra Jyothi he said that he is a great follower of P. Janardhan Reddy, he and his wife worship him everyday and he admires him a lot.

After delimitation of constituencies, Nagender contested and won from Khairathabad Assembly Constituency in 2009 elections.

Nagender was inducted into the cabinet for the first time by YSR in 2009 and held the portfolio of Health and Medical Services and continued in the same portfolio in the cabinet of Konijeti Rosaiah.

References

Indian National Congress politicians from Telangana
Politicians from Hyderabad, India
Telugu politicians
Telangana politicians
Living people
1958 births
Telugu Desam Party politicians
Telangana MLAs 2018–2023